Zavan Kerr "Zay" Harding (born November 1, 1974, Lihue, Hawaii) is an American television personality and actor, who may be best known as "Jeff Northcutt" on the MTV television serial, Spyder Games, and as a host of the adventure travel television series, Globe Trekker. He is also the Host of Tough Trains, a docu-travel series from the English producers of Globe Trekker. In his 20+ years of on-camera experience, Zay has hosted shows on PBS, OLN, National Geographic, Travel, Discovery, and History channels.  Other notable TV appearances include Guest-Starring and Co-Starring roles on CBS's Hawaii Five-0 (2010 TV series), FX's American Horror Story and ABC's Mistresses (American TV series).

He graduated with Honors from Punahou School on Oahu, Hawaii, in 1993; and Southern Methodist University in Dallas, Texas, with a B.F.A. degree in 1997, with a Minor in Art.

Zay was named after his legendary Great-grandfather on his mother's side, Zay Jeffries — American Mining Engineer; Metallurgist; Awarded Doctor of Science from Harvard University; Inventor of original Selson Blue formula; 1946 Recipient of the John Fritz Medal; Vice-president of General Electric (GE); Recipient of President Truman's Medal for Merit for developing artillery shells capable of piercing the armor of World War II German tanks to win the war; and Consulting Engineer on the Manhattan Project, which produced the first atomic bomb.

On his father's side, Zay is also the grandson of former Sergeant at Arms of the United States House of Representatives, Kenneth R. Harding.

Zay is currently Co-Producing an environmental show with VoLo Foundation and Pilot Productions in the U.K., called "Extreme Green", in which they scour the planet for alternative solutions to Climate Change.

References

External links
 
 Zay Harding website

1974 births
Male actors from Hawaii
American male television actors
American television personalities
Living people
Southern Methodist University alumni
People from Lihue, Hawaii